Stazzano is a comune (municipality) in the Province of Alessandria in the Italian region Piedmont, located about  southeast of Turin and about  southeast of Alessandria.

The municipality of Stazzano contains the frazioni (subdivisions, mainly villages and hamlets) Vargo and Albarasca.

Stazzano borders the following municipalities: Borghetto di Borbera, Cassano Spinola, Sardigliano, Serravalle Scrivia, and Vignole Borbera.

Demographic evolution

References

Cities and towns in Piedmont